Elizabeth Barret is an American documentary filmmaker.

Filmography
Quilting Women (1980)
Hand-carved (1980)
Coalmining Women (1982)
Long Journey Home (1987)
Stranger with a Camera (2000)

Awards 
2000 Sundance Film Festival -  Nominated, Grand Jury Prize - Documentary
2000 International Documentary Association - Nominated, IDA Award - Feature Documentaries
2000 San Francisco International Film Festival - Won, Silver Spire, Film & Video - History
2012: Guggenheim Fellowship for Creative Arts - Photography from the John Simon Guggenheim Memorial Foundation, with Wendy Ewald, for Portraits and Dreams: A Revisitation

References 

American documentary filmmakers
Place of birth missing (living people)
Year of birth missing (living people)
Living people